The 2017 Sicilian regional election for the renewal of the Sicilian Regional Assembly and the election of the President of Sicily was held on 5 November 2017. Incumbent President Rosario Crocetta was not his party's candidate due to his low popularity. Nello Musumeci, leader of the movement Diventerà Bellissima, was elected president.

Electoral system
The Sicilian Parliament is elected with a mixed system: 62 MPs are chosen with a form of proportional representation using a largest remainder method with open lists and a 5% threshold, while 8 MPs (7+1) are elected using Party bloc vote.

Parties and leaders

Opinion polling

Results

Notes

2017 elections in Italy
Elections in Sicily
November 2017 events in Italy